Theron Akin (May 23, 1855 – March 26, 1933) was an American politician who served one term as a U.S. Representative from New York from 1911 to 1913.

Biography
Born in Johnstown, New York, on May 23, 1855 Akin was the son of Ethan and Susan (St. John) Akin, and attended the common schools of Amsterdam, New York, and also was privately tutored at home. He engaged in agricultural pursuits, and graduated from the New York Dental College and practiced for twelve years in Amsterdam, New York. He married Carrie Bell on September 24, 1874, and they had two children, Harry and Florence. He married Mary Sanford on December 16, 1880, and they had one child, David. In 1904 he married Jennie and in 1920 he married Jane Bornt.

Career
Akin moved to Akin (later Fort Johnson), New York, and engaged in agricultural pursuits in Montgomery County. The village of Akin changed its name because of residents' disapproval of Theron Akin. He served as president of the village of Fort Johnson, New York.

Congress 
Elected as a Progressive Republican to the Sixty-second Congress as a U. S. Representative of the twenty-fifth district of New York, Akin served from March 4, 1910 to March 3, 1912. He was an unsuccessful candidate for renomination on the Progressive ticket in 1912 and resumed agricultural pursuits. He was again an unsuccessful candidate for election to the Sixty-fourth Congress on the Progressive ticket in 1914.

Akin served as Mayor of Amsterdam, New York from 1920 to 1924. He resumed his former pursuits, and was an unsuccessful candidate for the Republican and Democratic mayoralty nomination in 1927.

Death
Akin died, from a stroke of paralysis, in Amsterdam, Montgomery County, New York, on March 26, 1933 (age 77 years, 307 days). He is interred at Pine Grove Cemetery, Tribes Hill, New York.

References

External links

 

1855 births
1933 deaths
People from Fulton County, New York
American people of Scottish descent
Republican Party members of the United States House of Representatives from New York (state)
Progressive Party (1912) members of the United States House of Representatives from New York (state)
New York (state) Democrats
Mayors of places in New York (state)
People from Amsterdam, New York
Members of the United States House of Representatives from New York (state)